Saint-Pierre-Azif is a commune in the Calvados department in the Normandy region in northwestern France.

Population

Personality
 the doctor Louis Lépecq de La Clôture retired to his family home and died there on 5 November 1804.

See also
Communes of the Calvados department

References

Mentioned by author George Sand in her children's story "The Wings of Courage" (1872) as the home of the story's hero, Clopinet. 

Communes of Calvados (department)
Calvados communes articles needing translation from French Wikipedia